The British Culture Archive is a non-profit organisation and platform for British documentary photography based in Manchester. Its website, community workshops and exhibitions show 20th-century working class history and popular culture. In 2021 the organisation set up BCA21 which highlights 21st Century documentary photography. It has exhibited in London, Manchester and Berlin. Its People's Archive offshoot crowdsources images of everyday life in Britain from the 1930s to 2000.

Details 
The British Culture Archive was founded by Paul Wright in 2017 as a website. It was established to document and highlight the changes in 20th-century British culture and society through social and documentary photography. Its focus is on documenting everyday life, in particular working class history and British counterculture and fashions of the 20th century.

The British Culture Archive encompasses the work of established photographers, such as Tish Murtha, Kevin Cummins and Peter Mitchell, and that of others whose work documents social change in British society but has not been widely seen. An example of the latter is Heidi Alexander's photographs of Stockport.

Exhibitions 
British Culture Archive, The Social, London, November 2019 – January 2020. With work by Tish Murtha, Rob Bremner and Richard Davis.
The People's City, The Refuge, Manchester, January–September 2020. With work by Peter J Walsh, Rob Bremner and Richard Davis.
British Shorts, Sputnik Kino, Kreuzberg, Berlin, January 2020 – January 2021. With work by Tish Murtha, Rob Bremner and Richard Davis.
Use Hearing Protection: the early years of factory records, The Museum of Science and Industry, Manchester. June 2021 - January 2022. With work from Red Saunders, Thomas Blower, Luis Bustamante and The People's Archive.
A Woman's Work, The Refuge, Manchester, March – June 2022. With work by Tish Murtha and Anne Worthington.
Together As One, The Refuge, Manchester, July - September 2022. With Work from Peter J Walsh and Jon Shard. 
A Celebration Of Life In The North, 1970s-80s, Bury Art Museum, February - May, 2023. With Work from Luis Bustamante, Don Tonge and Thomas Blower.

The People's Archive 
The British Culture Archive crowdfunded its People's Archive offshoot. This was established in 2017 for crowdsourced images of everyday life in Britain from the 1930s to 2000 and the rapid rise of smartphones and social media. The British Culture Archive intends to house this archive alongside exhibitions in its permanent space, set to open in 2023.

References

External links 

BBC 6 Music Three Minute Epiphany – Paul Wright: British Culture Archive

Photo archives in the United Kingdom
Photography websites
British photography organisations
Photography in the United Kingdom
Organizations established in 2017
Organisations based in Manchester
Culture in Manchester
British websites
Internet properties established in 2017